The men's track time trial cycling event at the 1948 Summer Olympics took place on 11 August and was one of six events at the 1948 Olympics. Twenty-one cyclists from 21 nations competed, with each nation limited to one competitor. The event was won by Jacques Dupont of France, the nation's first victory in the event since 1896 and third consecutive podium appearance. Pierre Nihant earned Belgium's first medal in the men's track time trial with his silver; Tommy Godwin similarly took Great Britain's first medal in the event with his bronze.

Background

This was the fifth appearance of the event, which had previously been held in 1896 and every Games since 1928. It would be held every Games until being dropped from the programme after 2004. None of the cyclists from 1936 returned. Jacques Dupont of France was the French champion and had set an unofficial world record of 1:08.6.

Cuba, Guyana, India, Pakistan, Trinidad and Tobago, Uruguay, and Venezuela each made their debut in the men's track time trial. France and Great Britain each made their fifth appearance, having competed at every appearance of the event.

Competition format

The event was a time trial on the track, with each cyclist competing separately to attempt to achieve the fastest time. Each cyclist raced one kilometre from a standing start. The track's asphalt surface led to slow times.

Records

The following were the world and Olympic records prior to the competition.

No new world or Olympic records were set during the competition.

Schedule

All times are British Summer Time (UTC+1)

Results

References

Cycling at the 1948 Summer Olympics
Cycling at the Summer Olympics – Men's track time trial
Track cycling at the 1948 Summer Olympics